Aleksei Anatolyevich Kozlov (born 25 December 1986) is a Russian footballer. He plays as right-back.

Club career
Kozlov made his professional debut in the Russian First Division in 2007 for FC KAMAZ Naberezhnye Chelny.

On 24 June 2019, he left FC Dynamo Moscow after 5.5 seasons upon the expiration of his contract.

On 3 July 2019, he signed with FC Rostov.

On 9 July 2021, he joined Nizhny Novgorod, newly promoted into the Russian Premier League.

International
On 7 June 2013, Kozlov made his debut appearance for Russian national team under manager Fabio Capello in World Cup qualification away game versus Portugal (0-1). He entered the pitch on 31 min when starting right-back Aleksandr Anyukov picked up an injury.

On 2 June 2014, he was included in the Russia's 2014 FIFA World Cup squad. He played in the last two group games against Belgium and Algeria as Russia did not advance past the group stage.

Individual honours
 List of 33 top players of the Russian league: #3 (2013/14).

Career statistics

References

External links

1986 births
People from Petrozavodsk
Living people
Russian footballers
Russia international footballers
Association football defenders
FC KAMAZ Naberezhnye Chelny players
FC Kuban Krasnodar players
FC Dynamo Moscow players
FC Rostov players
FC Nizhny Novgorod (2015) players
Oberliga (football) players
Russian Premier League players
Russian First League players
2014 FIFA World Cup players
Russian expatriate footballers
Expatriate footballers in Germany
Russian expatriate sportspeople in Germany
Sportspeople from the Republic of Karelia